Hannah Takes the Stairs is a 2007 American independent mumblecore film by Joe Swanberg. It has been described "as the defining movie of the low-budget, dialogue-driven 'mumblecore' movement."

Plot
Hannah is a recent college graduate living in Chicago who works as an intern at a production office during the summer. She finds herself torn between three different men: her boyfriend Mike, and Matt and Paul, two screenwriters she works with. While coasting from relationship to relationship, Hannah attempts to find a direction for her life.

Cast 
 Greta Gerwig as Hannah
 Kent Osborne as Matt
 Andrew Bujalski as Paul
 Ry Russo-Young as Rocco
 Mark Duplass as Mike

Production
The film’s dialogue is largely improvisational. Said Swanberg, "We had the concept of the three guys [Hannah has relationships with] from the very beginning, and the general flow of the movie, so that structure helped. One of the other things that helped us was we started thinking of the movie in a kind of palindrome structure: the beginning and the end would mirror each other, and we’d work inward from that. Those were formal devices that we used, but then all the dialogue was improvised so things that came up naturally just had to be worked in."

The film was shot on digital video with all the participants living together in a Chicago apartment for the duration of filming.

Release
The movie was screened within such festivals as Maryland Film Festival and was released on DVD on April 22, 2008.

Reception 
The film received divided reactions from critics. Positive reviews praised the charm of the actors and its experimental approach. Richard Brody of The New Yorker wrote, "Swanberg focuses on a narrow slice of reality, a slender patch of urban-postgrad turf, but he observes it intimately and passionately; few intellectual characters speak as articulately, and elaborate their feelings as plausibly, as his Hannah." Wesley Morris of The Boston Globe said, "It's too tempting to roll your eyes at the film's blissful navel-gazing, but Joe Swanberg has an uncanny talent for making the randomness of downtime feel as alive as it seems generationally true."

Carina Chocano of the Los Angeles Times wrote the film "perfectly encapsulates the slow-motion, frustrated feeling of early adulthood, when longing and inchoate desire easily outnumber actual transformative events and achievements." In The New York Times, Matt Zoller Seitz remarked that the assembly of multiple Swanberg collaborators "[transforms] what might otherwise have been merely a slight but likable comedy into the D.I.Y. equivalent of a rock ’n’ roll supergroup: the mumblecore Asia." He added, "As played by the actress-writer Greta Gerwig, Hannah is neurotic, sweet and mildly sarcastic, in a Gen Y-Diane Keaton sort of way, and her small-stakes odyssey through three relationships is wryly observed."

Conversely, others expressed that the film was "unfocused" and "indulgent". G. Allen Johnson of the San Francisco Chronicle remarked the "film wears out its welcome about halfway through its 83 minutes. I'd say it doesn't go anywhere, but that's the point of these movies." Giving the film a B- grade, Owen Gleiberman of Entertainment Weekly said, "Hannah (Greta Gerwig), the peroxided heroine, leaps from one hookup to the next, but is she searching for passion or just treading water? In the new generational film movement that's been dubbed 'Mumblecore,' it's often hard to tell the difference."

On Rotten Tomatoes, Hannah Takes the Stairs has an approval rating of 59% based on 46 reviews. The site’s critics consensus reads, "Although not terribly focused, Hannah Takes the Stairs contains refreshing realism."

In popular culture
The movie is referenced in the song "Hannah" by indie rock band Freelance Whales.

References

External links
 Official site
 
 

American independent films
2007 independent films
2007 films
Films directed by Joe Swanberg
Films with screenplays by Greta Gerwig
Mumblecore films
2000s English-language films
2000s American films